Carlos Reyté (born 12 January 1956) is a retired Cuban sprinter.

References

1956 births
Living people
Cuban male sprinters
Place of birth missing (living people)
Pan American Games medalists in athletics (track and field)
Pan American Games bronze medalists for Cuba
Athletes (track and field) at the 1983 Pan American Games
Central American and Caribbean Games gold medalists for Cuba
Competitors at the 1982 Central American and Caribbean Games
Central American and Caribbean Games medalists in athletics
Medalists at the 1983 Pan American Games
Friendship Games medalists in athletics
20th-century Cuban people